Mark Stuart Cameron is a New Zealand politician and dairy farmer who was elected to the New Zealand parliament at the 2020 general election as a representative of the ACT New Zealand party.

Early life and career
Mark Cameron is a dairy farmer from Ruawai in Northland. Cameron has lived and farmed in the Northland region for 30 years, and is married with three children.

Political career

In the 2020 New Zealand General Election, Cameron ran for the electorate of Northland, coming in at fourth place via the ACT Party list.  He was selected as the ACT Party spokesman for Primary Industries, Regional Economic Development and Biosecurity.

Cameron is a prominent spokesman for issues in rural communities such as farming regulations and mental health.  Cameron has been critical of several climate change measures taken by the New Zealand government, stating that some scientists and politicians are "perpetuating an environment of fear" against rural farmers. Cameron advocates for more regional solutions to tackle environmental issues, rather than top-down government policy.  Cameron was an advocate of the End of Life Choice Act 2019.

During parliamentary question time on 18 November 2021, Cameron asked Minister for Rural Communities Damien O'Connor, who was absent and was represented by his colleague Stuart Nash, if he had met the leaders of farming advocacy group Groundswell NZ. In response, Nash alleged that the group promoted racism and vaccine hesitancy.
When Cameron reiterated his question, Nash told Cameron to avoid posing with someone holding an anti-vaccination sign at a Groundswell protest. Nash's remarks were criticised as slanderous by Groundswell NZ leader Bryce McKenzie, who emphasized the group's efforts to combat racism and anti-vaccination sentiment among its members and social media platforms. A few days after the exchange with Nash, Newshub reported that in 2019 Cameron had made online comments referring to Jacinda Ardern as a "feckless wench" and "vacuous teenager," and endorsing the repurposing of the MAGA acronym to stand for "Make Ardern go away." He had also described Donald Trump as "making his country awesome." When asked about the comments, Cameron expressed regret for what he described as "flippant remarks," made while he was "a civilian, not a parliamentarian."

References

1970s births
Living people
People from the Kaipara District
ACT New Zealand MPs
Members of the New Zealand House of Representatives
New Zealand list MPs
New Zealand farmers
Year of birth missing (living people)